Braided stainless steel brake lines (also known as braided stainless steel brake hoses) are flexible hoses fitted to a hydraulic brake system. The intent of braided stainless steel brake lines is to improve brake system effectiveness and longevity as compared to an equivalent system fitted with flexible rubber hoses through near-elimination of hose expansion.

The difference in expansion characteristics between rubber and braided stainless steel brake lines is a result of differences in hose construction. Where rubber hoses typically consist of a rubber inner hose wrapped in a textile reinforcement braid then covered in an additional rubber outer sheath, braided stainless steel hoses typically consist of a Teflon or generic PTFE (polytetrafluoroethylene) inner hose wrapped in a braid consisting of stainless steel wire. The stainless wire braid more effectively resists expansion due to pressure inside the hose core. This improves brake system effectiveness by more directly transferring operator input (hydraulic pressure) to brake friction surfaces. While available without a coating, the stainless braid is typically coated or covered with a clear or colored material such as PVC (polyvinyl chloride) to protect the wire and inner hose from the elements and chemicals, to protect the vehicle or machine from abrasion, and for an improved appearance. Coated braided stainless steel hoses have the same essential construction as rubber hoses in terms of an inner hose wrapped in a braid followed by an outer layer, but the different materials in the braided stainless steel hoses offer substantially different and arguably better characteristics. To more thoroughly explain why, it is helpful to understand the basics of a hydraulic brake system.

Technical Rationale
The typical operation of a hydraulic brake system uses the premise of fluid displacement to convert operator input into friction. This fluid transfer is accomplished by a connecting tube and/or hose from one hydraulic cylinder (often called the master cylinder) to another (located at the brakes of each wheel). In practice, an operator control such as a brake pedal or lever attached to a hydraulic cylinder is connected in turn, via a tube/hose, to another hydraulic cylinder responsible for applying friction to a moving surface. This network of operator control(s), tube/hose, and cylinder(s) is filled with hydraulic fluid such that input from the operator displaces fluid at the control location, resulting in movement at the opposite end of the system. The ideal hydraulic brake system would use only hard tubing such as galvanized or stainless steel pipe, as this would prevent any expansion along the hydraulic fluid path, providing the most direct transfer of operator input force to the friction surfaces, and in fact most of the length of a brake line is made of stainless steel. However, hard tubing will not endure the motions caused by articulation of suspension components. For example, an automobile wheel is not hard-mounted to the automobile's frame or unibody chassis. It is instead mounted to a suspension component which allows that wheel to move in response to road irregularities and steering inputs. Because the wheel must be able to move, a length of flexible hose must be used between the end of the run of metal brake line tubing, and the brake at each wheel. Since the ideal brake system would use only hard tubing for its lack of expansion, but some use of flexible hose is required, the ideal compromise is to use a hose type that allows a minimal rate of expansion. Thus the assertion that braided stainless steel hose is superior as compared to a typical rubber hose when used in a hydraulic brake system.

In light of the above, it is reasonable to ask why rubber brake hose is used at all, instead of always using braided stainless steel hose. The most typical reason is cost, but also use case. Braided stainless steel hose is typically more expensive than rubber. When the cost difference is extrapolated across hundreds or thousands of units, it is quite compelling to opt for the rubber option, especially when the use case exhibits that the operator will not need or want the additional capabilities offered by a brake system equipped with braided stainless steel brake lines. It thus stands to reason that braided stainless steel brake lines are typically only seen on upmarket motor vehicles such as hot-rods and supercars, or on race-prepped vehicles such as those used in Formula One and touring car series. Braided stainless steel brake lines are a common aftermarket upgrade, purchased and installed after a vehicle is initially purchased.

Vehicle braking technologies